George Negus Tonight (formerly titled Dimensions) was an Australian current affairs television series hosted by George Negus, which ran on ABC Television from 2001 to 2004.

Dimensions
The program was initially launched in 2001 as Dimensions, pitched as a low-cost stream of tenuously linked programs to run in the 6.30pm timeslot from Monday to Thursday before the ABC News 7pm bulletin. Dimensions had a particular focus for each day of the week: Monday was Media Dimensions which focused on the Australian media; Tuesday was Health Dimensions which concentrated on health matters; Wednesday was People Dimensions which profiled prominent Australians and overseas guests; and Thursday was On The Move Dimensions which looked at how 21st-century Australian society was "on the move".

New Dimensions and George Negus Tonight
The program was relaunched in 2002 as New Dimensions, with the veteran Australian journalist, George Negus, as the sole host, replacing the format of different hosts for each day, which the previous incarnation had used. During the following year, the program was renamed New Dimensions with George Negus and finally,  George Negus Tonight. The program retained the different focus for each day: GNT History on Monday; GNT People on Tuesday; GNT Future on Wednesday and GNT Profiles on Thursday.

Despite high ratings for its timeslot (generally the highest ABC ratings in the 6:30pm slot), George Negus Tonight was axed by the ABC in November 2004, to make way for state-based programming. Negus went on to host Dateline on the SBS network.

References

External links
George Negus Tonight home page (ABC TV)
Media Dimensions home page (ABC TV)

Australian Broadcasting Corporation original programming
Australian non-fiction television series
2001 Australian television series debuts
2004 Australian television series endings